The men's hammer throw event at the 2003 Summer Universiade was held on 27 August in Daegu, South Korea.

Results

References
Results

Athletics at the 2003 Summer Universiade
2003